Jeffry P. Freundlich (born July 14, 1952), primarily known by his pen name Jeff Lindsay, is an American playwright and crime novelist best known for his novels about sociopathic Miami Police Department forensic analyst and serial killer-killing vigilante Dexter Morgan.

Life and career 

Lindsay was born in Miami and graduated from Ransom Everglades School in 1970, and from Middlebury College, Vermont, in 1975.

Many of his earlier published works include his wife Hilary Hemingway as a co-author. His wife is the niece of Ernest Hemingway and an author in her own right.

The first book in the Dexter series, Darkly Dreaming Dexter (which Lindsay wanted to name "Pinocchio Bleeds" after his middle daughter suggested it but his publisher disagreed) was included on the original nomination list for the Mystery Writers of America's Edgar Awards in the Best First Novel category. However, it was dropped from the list after the group learned that Lindsay had put out several books in the 1990s under another pen name, Jeffry P. Lindsay.

Dexter aired as a series on Showtime with the first season based on Darkly Dreaming Dexter and actor Michael C. Hall playing the character. The show eventually ran for eight seasons, though subsequent seasons had original storylines that departed from the plots of Lindsay's books. Lindsay had a cameo role in the tenth episode of the third season of Dexter. Lindsay has also written a comic book version of Dexter, distributed by Marvel comics, and which consists of two mini-series: Dexter and Dexter: Down Under.

Lindsay and Hemingway live in Cape Coral, Florida. They have three children.

Bibliography

Novels

Billy Knight Thrillers series:
 Tropical Depression: A Novel of Suspense, or Tropical Depression (1994)
 Tropical Depression: A Novel of Suspense (1994), as Jeffry P. Lindsay
 Tropical Depression (2015)
 Red Tide (2015)

Dexter series:
 Darkly Dreaming Dexter (2004)
 Dearly Devoted Dexter (2005)
 Dexter in the Dark (2007)
 Dexter by Design (2009)
 Dexter Is Delicious (2010)
 Double Dexter (2011)
 Dexter's Final Cut (2013)
 Dexter Is Dead (2015)

Riley Wolfe series:

 Just Watch Me (2019)
 Fool Me Twice (2020)
 Three-Edged Sword (Expected publication: December 6, 2022)

Stand-alones:
 Dream Land: A Novel of the UFO Cover-Up (1995), as Jeffry P. Lindsay, with Hilary Hemingway
 Time Blender (1997), as Jeffry P. Lindsay, with Michael Dorn and Hilary Hemingway, 
 Dreamchild (1998), as Jeffry P. Lindsay, with Hilary Hemingway,

Comics
 Dexter: A Graphic Novel (2013–2014), 5 volumes
 Dexter Down Under (2014), 5 volumes

Non-fiction
 Hunting with Hemingway: Based on the Stories of Leicester Hemingway, or Hunting with Hemingway (2000), with Hilary Hemingway, biography

Adaptations 
 Dexter (2006–2013), television series created by James Manos Jr., based on Dexter series
 Dexter: Serial Killer by Night (2006), short film, based on Dexter series
 Dexter: Blood Spatter (2006), animated series, based on Dexter series
 The Dark Defender (2007), animated series, based on Dexter series
 Dexter: Early Cuts (2009–2012), animated series directed by Marco Fernandez, based on Dexter series
 Dexter: New Blood (2021–2022), miniseries directed by Marcos Siega, based on Dexter series

Footnotes

References

External links

 Random House Dexter web site
 Fantastic Fiction Author Page
 

1952 births
20th-century American male writers
20th-century American novelists
21st-century American male writers
21st-century American novelists
American crime fiction writers
American male novelists
Dilys Award winners
Living people
Middlebury College alumni
People from Cape Coral, Florida
Writers from Miami